The 1970 Montana State Bobcats football team was an American football team that represented Montana State University in the Big Sky Conference during the 1970 NCAA College Division football season. In their third and final season under head coach Tom Parac, the Bobcats compiled a 2–8 record (1–5 against Big Sky opponents) and finished sixth out of seven teams in the Big Sky.

Defensive end Gary Gustafson received second-team honors on the 1970 Little All-America college football team.

Schedule

References

Montana State
Montana State Bobcats football seasons
Montana State Bobcats football